This is a chronology of the LGM-30 Minuteman intercontinental ballistic missile, acquisition and operational.

Program chronology

1956
Von Neumann Committee approved Ballistic Missile feasibility program
R&D programs and contracts authorized
1957
ICBM improvements studies started
Minuteman configuration studies started
 1958
Minuteman R&D program authorized
1959
First R&D firing from silo - inert second and third stage
1960
First contract for operational wing facilities at Wing I
Missile production
1961
First all-up missile launch from pad at Eastern Test Range
First missile launch from silo at Eastern Test Range
1962
First missile launch from Western Test Range
Minuteman I operational flight turnover at Wing I
1963
First wing turnover at Wing I, Wing II turnover
Force Mod program approved
First motor static test firing to verify reliability
1964
Wing III and Wing IV turnover
New features approved
Minuteman II flight test
GIANT BOOST
1965
Wing V turnover
Vulnerability improvements
Minuteman fully operational at Wing II, Wing III
1966
Wing IV turnover
Minuteman III approval
Aging surveillance program initiated
Minuteman II operational at Wing VI
ERCS deployed
1967
Squadron 20 turnover
Force Mod at Wing IV
Airborne Launch Control System goes on alert
1968
Hard rock silo program started
First Minuteman III R&D flight
1969
Force Mod rate decrease
Force Mod at Wing I complete
Service Star testing began for RSs
1970 
First Minuteman III at Wing III (Hotel Flight/H-02)
Upgrade silo and CDB programs started
First MOM test at Wing VI
1971
Minuteman III dust program started
Force Mod at Wing III completed
1972
Minuteman III deployed at Wing VI
First dust-hardened Minuteman III deployed at Wing VI
Minuteman ordnance service life analysis program developed
Responsibility for service life testing transferred to Ogden Air Logistics Center (OO-ALC), Hill Air Force Base, Utah
1973
Upgrade silo and CDB IOC at Wing V
Force Mod and upgrade silo completed at Wing II
Last MOM at Wing III
1974
Full Force upgrade silo approved
MK12A and Pave Pepper programs started
SSAS was deployed for Minuteman II
1975
Upgrade silo and CDB completed at Wing V
Upgrade silo and CDB start at Wing III
Simulated Electronic Launch Minuteman (SELM) program started
Minuteman bench test program concept developed by OO-ALC
Minuteman III fully deployed
Minuteman program management responsibility transfer (PMRT)
1976
Upgrade silo and CDB completed at Wing III
Upgrade silo and CDB completed at Wing VI
Long range service life analysis performed for propulsion system
Hybrid explicit implemented for Minuteman III
Minuteman II MGS vibration test program initiated
New calibration schedule implemented to correct MGS startup transients
Minuteman II Stage 3 lot 16 motor igniters replaced
1977
Minuteman III missile production terminated
Inertial performance data began to be collected for guidance system fault isolation
Began implementation of ILCS at Minuteman II wings
1978
GIP implemented at Minuteman III
Thrust termination port investigation began
1979
Minuteman II stage 2 motor remanufacturing program began to correct degraded liner/Minuteman III stage 3 degraded liner investigation initiated
USAF advisory board recommended that carbon-carbon nose tips be developed for MK12 RVs
1980
Upgrade silo and CDB completed at Wing VI
Minuteman II accuracy/reliability investigation conducted
VRSA replacement design started
Diagnostic data package hardware delivered to provide re-entry/separation data for Minuteman II flights
1981
MGS electronics investigation completed
Accuracy, Reliability, Supportability Improvement Program (ARSIP) program began
1982
Minuteman III guidance upgrade program implemented
MK12A re-entry vehicle FOC
Special operational test program began - Minuteman II
Hardness critical items identified and procured
1983
Minuteman III MGS vibration test program initiated
Special operational test program complete - accuracy improvements verified
1984
Minuteman Extended Survivable Power IOC
GUP implemented for Minuteman III
1985
Rivet MILE (Minuteman Integrated Life Extension) program began
1986
LGM-118A Peacekeeper deployment initiated
1987
Integrated Nuclear Effects Assessment (INEA)
ARSIP implemented for Minuteman II
Piece-parts manufacturing for diminished manufacturing sources
Rivet MILE began Improved Minuteman Physical Security System (IMPSS) installation
1988
Minuteman III Stage 2 washout/Stage 3 replacement
Comprehensive reliability investigations conducted
Peacekeeper fully operational at Wing V
1989
Rapid Execution and Combat Targeting (REACT) program initiated
Rocket Motor Transporter replacement
Code Change Verifier replacement
Transporter-Erector replacement
1990
1991
Minuteman II removed from SIOP
1992
Minuteman II deactivation initiated
MESP discontinued
Rivet MILE completes IMPSS installation
SRV Program initiated
Rivet ADD initiated
Missile Transporter replacement
Missile Transporter (PT III) replacement
1993
GRP contract awarded
1994
PRP initial contracts awarded
1995
REACT consoles begin deployment
Minuteman II deactivation complete
BRAC decision to close Wing VI by 1998
1996
REACT deployment complete
1998
Wing VI deactivation complete
Wing VI Minuteman IIIs moved to Wing I
AF awards ICBM Prime contract to TRW team for ICBM engineering
1999
First NS-50 MGS deployed
Congress establishes the Minuteman Missile National Historic Site
2000
2001
PRP deployment initiated
2005
Peacekeeper deactivation complete
2007-08
Deactivation and removal of 50 Minuteman III's at Malmstrom AFB, MT.

Test Launches

References

LGM-030
Cold War weapons of the United States